Tata Kazika (Kazik's Dad) is an album by Kult, released in April 1993. It contains the songs written by Kazik's father, Stanisław Staszewski.

Track listing
all tracks by Stanisław Staszewski except where noted.
 "Celina" (Celine) – 6:46
 "Dziewczyna się bała pogrzebów" (The Girl Was Afraid of Funerals) – 4:32
 "Baranek" (The Little Lamb) – 4:22
 "Notoryczna narzeczona" (The Habitual Fiancée) – 3:06
 "Królowa życia" (The Queen of Life) – 5:03
 "Inżynierowie z Petrobudowy" (The Engineers from Petrochemy) – 2:45
 "Knajpa morderców" (The Murderers' Dive) – 4:46
 "W czarnej urnie" (In the Black Urn) – 4:34
 "Wróci wiosna, baronowo" (The Spring Will Return, Baroness) (lyrics by K.I. Gałczyński) – 5:43
 "Marianna" (Marianne) – 5:02
 "Kurwy wędrowniczki" (Roaming Whores) – 4:21
 "Bal kreślarzy" (Draughtsmen's Ball) – 3:06
 "Dyplomata" (The Diplomat) (traditional) – 2:23

Credits
 Kazik Staszewski – lead vocalist, saxophone;
 Krzysztof Banasik – French horn, saxophone, guitar, vocalist;
 Janusz Grudziński – piano, keyboards, vocalist;
 Piotr Morawiec – guitar;
 Andrzej Szymańczak – drumset;
 Ireneusz Wereński – bass guitar;
 Romuald Kunikowski – accordion;
 Wojciech Przybylski – sound engineer;

References
 

Kult (band) albums
1993 albums